Glecia Bear or Nêhiyaw (April 29, 1912 in Green Lake, Saskatchewan - September 1998, Flying Dust First Nation) was a Saskatchewan-born Cree elder and a traditional tale teller. Her stories were recorded and translated by Freda Ahenakew.

She was the first female chief of the Flying Dust First Nation.

Works 
In Kthkominawak otbcimowiniwbwa, Glecia Bear tells her life story as a Cree woman. In Wanisinwak iskwesisak : awasisasinahikanis, Glecia Bear recalls being lost in the forest with her little sister when they were eleven and eight years old.

Bibliography

References

External links 

 Biografia
 At Viquipèdia

1912 births
1998 deaths
Cree people
First Nations women writers
First Nations women in politics
Indigenous leaders in Saskatchewan
Canadian children's writers
Canadian storytellers
Women storytellers
20th-century Canadian women writers
20th-century First Nations writers